Saul Newman (born 22 March 1972) is a British political theorist who writes on post-anarchism. He is professor of political theory at Goldsmiths College, University of London.

Newman took up the term "post-anarchism" as a general term for political philosophies filtering 19th century anarchism through a post-structuralist lens, and later popularized it through his 2001 book From Bakunin to Lacan. Thus he rejects a number of concepts traditionally associated with anarchism, including essentialism, a "positive" human nature, and the concept of revolution. The links between poststructuralism and anarchism have also been developed by thinkers like Todd May and Lewis Call.

He received his B.A. from the University of Sydney, and his Ph.D in political science from the University of New South Wales. His work has been translated into Turkish, Spanish, Italian, German, Portuguese and Serbo-Croatian, and has been the subject of a number of debates amongst anarchist theorists and activists as well as academics.

Works 

 From Bakunin to Lacan. Anti-Authoritarianism and the Dislocation of Power. Lanham MD: Lexington Books 2001
 Power and Politics in Poststructuralist Thought: New Theories of the Political. London: Routledge 2005
 Unstable Universalities: Postmodernity and Radical Politics. Manchester: Manchester University Press 2007
 Politics Most Unusual: Violence, Sovereignty and Democracy in the 'War on Terror. (Co-authored with Michael Levine and Damian Cox). New York: Palgrave Macmillan 2009
 The Politics of Post Anarchism. Edinburgh: University of Edinburgh Press: 2010
 (ed.): Max Stirner. Houndmills, Basingstoke, Hampshire, UK; New York: Palgrave Macmillan 2011 
 Political Theology: a Critical Introduction. London: Polity 2018

 Notes I.'''  For reviews of From Bakunin to Lacan see:
 From Bakunin to Lacan: anti-authoritarianism and the Dislocation of Power. Review by Simon Tormey. Contemporary Political Theory, October 2003, Volume 2, Number 3, Pages 359–361.
  Lacanian Anarchism and the Left. Review by Todd May, Theory & Event 6:1, 2002.
 From Bakunin to Lacan: anti-authoritarianism and the Dislocation of Power.'' Review by Nathan Widder, History of Political Thought, 23 (4): 2002.

References

External links 
 

1972 births
Living people
Academics of Goldsmiths, University of London
British anarchists
British anti-capitalists
Postanarchists
Poststructuralists
University of New South Wales alumni